Tommy Sørensen (born 1 April 1979) is a Danish badminton player from Triton Aalborg Club. Sørensen is a triple World Senior Champion, having won title in men's doubles and twice in mixed doubles events.

Sørensen started playing badminton at the age of 3 and won 2 youth titles in his teens. He was particularly successful in the year 2001 when he won titles in Scotland, Norway and Slovakia. He became World Senior Champion for the first time in 2015 by winning title in mixed doubles discipline. In 2019 he became World Champion again in mixed doubles and men's doubles categories. He currently works as a Tail Inspector in Løgstrup in daily basis and trains in the badminton club Triton in Aalborg playing in 1st division badminton for the club.

Achievements

World Senior Championships 
Men's doubles

Mixed doubles

IBF Grand Prix 
The World Badminton Grand Prix has been sanctioned by the International Badminton Federation since 1983.

Men's doubles

Mixed doubles

IBF International 
Men's doubles

Mixed doubles

References 

1979 births
Living people
Sportspeople from Aalborg
Danish male badminton players